Pride of Bruges may refer to one of two ferries:

 Pride of Bruges in service under this name 1988–1999 with P&O European Ferries
  in service under this name 2003–present with P&O Ferries

Ship names